The Old Mill on Mols (Danish: Den gamle mølle paa Mols) is a 1953 Danish comedy film directed by Annelise Reenberg and starring Ib Schønberg, Henny Lindorff Buckhøj and Knud Heglund.

Cast
 Ib Schønberg as Peter Jens Christian Rasmussen  
 Henny Lindorff Buckhøj as Fru Rasmussen  
 Knud Heglund as Møller Sørensen  
 Inger Lassen as Fru Sørensen  
 Louis Miehe-Renard as Anders Sørensen  
 Karin Nellemose as Kristiane Mikkelsen 
 Angelo Bruun as Sognerådsformand Niels Kvist  
 Kai Holm as Properitær Englund  
 Henning Moritzen as Fløgstrup  
 Annemette Svendsen as Annemarie Poulsen 
 Rasmus Christiansen as Landbetjent Madsen  
 Henry Nielsen as Landpost Villy Christensen  
 Johannes Meyer as Klemmesen  
 Arthur Jensen as Karlsen  
 Lili Heglund as Spillelærerinden  
 Freddy Koch as Skolelæreren  
 Carl Heger as Mejerist Jakobsen  
 Karl Stegger as Skomager Hulsøm  
 Ove Sprogøe as Buschauffør  
 Else Petersen as Frøken Ballerup  
 Anna Henriques-Nielsen as Husholderske  
 Astrid Kraa as Vred smørrebrødsjomfru  
 Betty Helsengreen as Kvinde der taler med Annemarie  
 Elin Reimer as Proprietær Englunds datter  
 Inger Berthelsen

References

Bibliography 
 John Sundholm. Historical Dictionary of Scandinavian Cinema. Scarecrow Press, 2012.

External links 
 

1953 films
1953 comedy films
Danish comedy films
1950s Danish-language films
Films directed by Annelise Reenberg
Films scored by Sven Gyldmark
Danish black-and-white films